Mumm-Ra is a fictional supervillain and the main antagonist of the ThunderCats franchise. He is an undead evil sorcerer bound to the servitude of four malevolent, godlike entities known as the Ancient Spirits of Evil. Native to the planet of Third Earth, Mumm-Ra's goal is to destroy the ThunderCats and ensure his world remains under his control.

1985 series 
During development of the show, while the creators were looking for various names for the main villain character, nothing sounded "evil" enough; not until Haim Saban suggested to use Mummia Raa (מומי רעה – "A Bad Mummy" in Hebrew). It was shortened to Mumm-Ra.

The demon sorcerer Mumm-Ra is the self-proclaimed "ever-living source of evil" on Third Earth, possessed of powers of sorcery and an ageless lifespan. He is, in fact, a bound servant to the Ancient Spirits of Evil (represented by four anthropomorphic statues of a boar, crocodile, vulture, and ox) who provide him with power and virtual immortality to further his pursuit of spreading their dark influence throughout Third Earth.

Residing within the Black Pyramid amid the ruins of what appears to be an ancient Egyptian civilization, Mumm-Ra exists in a decayed, weakened form that must return to a stone sarcophagus to replenish his energy. He can summon the power to transform himself into a more vigorous, muscular form - Mumm-Ra, the Ever-Living - by reciting the incantation: "Ancient Spirits of Evil, transform this decayed form to Mumm-Ra, the Ever-Living!" While in this form, Mumm-Ra possesses fortification of his mystical might — casting spells, throwing energy bolts, etc. — to battle his foes.  He can also alter his physical form into a variety of alter-egos to deceive his enemies.

Seemingly invincible in whatever form he chooses, Mumm-Ra appears to have a singular weakness: seeing his own hideous reflection neutralizes his ability to remain outside the Black Pyramid and forces him to withdraw there in his emaciated mummy form. However, at the beginning of the second season, the Ancient Spirits of Evil overcome this shortcoming. Mumm-Ra is a master of deception, and will use whatever means necessary to fight against the forces of good. In later episodes, while endowing Mumm-Ra with his powers, the statues of the Ancient Spirits of Evil come down from their perches, and extend their arms over him.

He uses his magic to create disguises and deceive the ThunderCats on various occasions. Among these are: Diamondfly (in the episode "Queen of Eight Legs"), Gregory Gregion ("All That Glitters"), Silky ("The Garden of Delights"), The Netherwitch ("The Astral Prison"), and Pumm-Ra (in the episode "Pumm-Ra"). He once took the form of King Arthur to acquire the legendary magic sword Excalibur, using it against the Sword of Omens.

In a few episodes, Mumm-Ra has an even more powerful form beyond "Mumm-Ra the Ever-Living" called "Mumm-Ra the All-Powerful": in this manifestation, he absorbs the entire power of the Ancient Spirits of Evil to become grander in size and strength, and the design pattern on his loin cloth changes, as does his voice. This form is only presented in the series three times. In another incarnation, calling himself "Mumm-Ra the Dream Master", he enters the Thundercats' dreams to subliminally influence them.

Mumm-Ra is regarded as immortal, and when defeated, he simply returns to his sarcophagus. Mumm-Ra cannot be truly killed; even in cases where his body is destroyed, he will eventually be restored, as he often states: "Wherever evil exists, Mumm-Ra lives!"

Later, Mumm-Ra is shown to have a blue undead, bulldog-like companion named Ma-Mutt, capable of flight and supernatural feats of strength and speed. He is generally evil, though some episodes depict him as having sympathetic qualities. Ma-Mutt is the only living creature Mumm-Ra shows any compassion and love for - in one episode, after the machine in his evil plan is destroyed, he frantically searches for Ma-Mutt, and upon finding him, apologizes for being horrible to him.

Fed up with Mumm-Ra's repeated failures, the Ancient Sprirts of Evil demand he destroy the ThunderCats or be exiled from Third Earth. When he misses the deadline, they trap him in a crystal with a miniature pyramid and cast him to the furthest reaches of the universe. When the ThunderCats rebuild and colonize New Thundera, the Spirits free Mumm-Ra and rebuild his cauldron on Third Earth.

In one episode, it is said that Mumm-Ra once owned the Sphere of Seti which increased his power. When he recovers it after Char finds it, he plans to use it to increase his power and free himself from servitude to the Ancient Spirits of Evil. Angered at his plot, and his deceptive attempts to hide it, the Spirits seal off the Black Pyramid, forcing him to choose between sustenance (the pyramid) or power (the sphere). Ultimately, he admits he cannot survive without the pyramid, surrendering the sphere and  resuming his role as a servant.

2011 series 
In the 2011 version, Mumm-Ra is an Ancient Spirit of Evil employed by the Ancient Spirits of Evil (confirmed by series art director Dan Norton) with changes including demon wings on his Ever-Living form, a larger body, and a weakness to intensely bright light. His ultimate goal is universal domination and enforcing his ideal order on it. When utilizing the power of the Gauntlet of Plun-Darr, Mumm-Ra's power increases and he gains a robed armored form (this continuity's equivalent to the All-Powerful form), with a skeletal mask and Egyptian headdress. In his Ever-Living form, he continues the show's trend of all characters and creatures being animals by showing traits of a leaf-nosed vampire bat.

Centuries prior to the new series, Mumm-Ra used advanced technology and magic at his disposal to enslave the ancestors of the ThunderCats and the Animals into serving him so he would gather the Four Powerstones (the War Stone, the Tech Stone, the Spirit Stone, and the Soul Stone) from various planets to place on the Sword of Plun-Darr, a weapon forged from a star he had collapsed at the cost of the entire Plun-Darr galaxy. But managing to take the War Stone (which would become the Eye of Thundera) while staging a rebellion with the Animals' help, the ThunderCat Leo defeats Mumm-Ra and strips him of the other Powerstones. But when Mumm-Ra's pyramid spacecraft was pulled into Third Earth's atmosphere, Mumm-Ra entered his tomb to bide his time for everyone else to die in the resulting crash. However, the controls were smashed and Mumm-Ra was trapped within his pyramid as the stones and survivors spread across Third Earth.

Many centuries later, Mumm-Ra used Grune to release him from his prison and masterminded Thundera's downfall. With the aid of Grune and Slythe, Mumm-Ra not only plans to obtain the Eye of Thundera, but to regain the other three Powerstones in order to get to the Sword of Plun-Darr and the remaining stones. Mumm-Ra also resurrected Pumyra to serve him and planted her amongst the Thunderian slaves. After Grune ends up trapped in the Astral Plane, Mumm-Ra has Slithe recruit the homicidal Addicus and sociopathic Kaynar to not only ensure the loyalty of the Lizard army and punish any deserters, but also increase their numbers with the new generals' respective races. Later, through a calculated scheme involving the revelation of his own agent Pumyra, Mumm-Ra regains the Sword of Plun-Darr (along with his All-Powerful form) and the Tech Stone while gaining a new ally in Vultaire.

The series, had it not been cancelled, would presumably have followed Mumm-Ra's search for the final Stone, the Soul Stone.

ThunderCats Roar 
Mumm-Ra is similar to his original 1985 incarnation, initially appearing in the series in his "Ever-Living" form due to the power of his Doomstaff which he also used to establish a curse where whoever utters his name besides himself is struck by lightning. But the ThunderCats destroyed his staff, forcing him into his current state as he vows revenge.

Powers and abilities 
An absolute master of magic, Mumm-Ra possesses nearly unlimited knowledge of mystical arts from all corners of the universe. As such, he can summon their use to assist him in almost any manner he chooses. His abilities include energy manipulation, levitation, necromancy, alchemy, shapeshifting, temporal manipulation, teleportation, psychokinesis, transfiguration, mind control, astral projection, scrying, summoning monsters, and so on.

While in the form of Mumm-Ra the Ever-Living, he becomes a conduit for the Ancient Spirits of Evil; such that he can amplify his aforementioned abilities to a nearly cosmic scale, gain superhuman strength, as well as retain his undead status despite the passage of time or any injuries sustained. The price of this power however, is extremely limited stamina: once Mumm-Ra the Ever-Living has surpassed a given threshold of energy-expenditure, he must revert to his mummified form, and enter his sarcophagus to rejuvenate himself. Also, Mumm-Ra's power in his Ever-Living form is directly linked to the condition of both his sarcophagus and the Ancient Spirits' four statues within his pyramid; should any of them be harmed or destroyed, his power weakens immediately and considerably.

In the 2011 show, Mumm-Ra's Ever-Living form similarly amplifies his already formidable mystic powers, while not seeming to have any definite limit as to how long he can maintain this form. Once he recovers the Gauntlet of Plun-Darr (the precursor to the Gauntlet of Omens, Lion-O's gauntlet), he is able to use a double-edged sword decorated with bat wings and a ring where the Eye of Thundera could fit. He can use the gauntlet in his Ever-Living form so as to achieve an All-Powerful form (or a form analogous to the 1980s version) which increases his power further, allowing his double-edged sword to become a dual-bladed scimitar. However, this form can only be achieved if he has two or more of the Powerstones in his possession. If his Powerstones are stripped from his gauntlet while in his All-Powerful form, Mumm-Ra reverts to his skinny, mummified self.

Reception 
Mumm-Ra has been generally well-received by the public and fans alike Viewers have noted the character for his notoriously-frightening appearance and deep, raspy voice. In addition, Mumm-Ra is also praised for being much more competent than other famous cartoon villains from the 1980s; such as Skeletor of Masters of the Universe fame.

In popular culture 
 Mumm-Ra was the name of a British indie band named after the cartoon character.
 Mumm-Ra appeared in different episodes of Robot Chicken, voiced by Donald Faison.
 Mumm-Ra appears in the Family Guy episode "The Man with Two Brians". When Brian Griffin is living with Cleveland Brown, Cleveland insists on walking Brian on a leash while he uses the bathroom. Mumm-Ra then appears, looking into his cauldron, and says, "I'm watching you make stool!"
 Mumm-Ra is referenced in rapper Lakutis' song "Mumra".
 Mumm-Ra is referenced in rapper Lupe Fiasco's verse in Kanye West's song "Touch the Sky".
 Mumm-Ra is mentioned on Aesop Rock's track titled "Tetra".

References

External links
Mumm-Ra at Comic Vine

Ancient Egypt in fiction
Fictional characters who can teleport
Fictional characters who have made pacts with devils
Fictional characters who use magic
Fictional characters with accelerated healing
Fictional characters with energy-manipulation abilities
Fictional characters with evocation or summoning abilities
Fictional characters with immortality
Fictional characters with superhuman durability or invulnerability
Fictional characters with superhuman strength
Fictional demons and devils
Fictional humanoids
Fictional liches
Fictional mass murderers
Fictional mummies
Fictional necromancers
Fictional shapeshifters
Fictional swordfighters
Fictional telekinetics
Fictional wizards
Male characters in animated series
Male supervillains
Television characters introduced in 1985
ThunderCats
Villains in animated television series